was a Japanese girl group and sub-group of Morning Musume. The group was made up of five past and then-present members of Morning Musume and created to celebrate their 10th anniversary.

Members 
 1st generation: Kaori Iida, Natsumi Abe
 3rd generation: Maki Goto
 5th generation: Risa Niigaki
 7th generation: Koharu Kusumi

History
In early 2007, Morning Musume Tanjō 10nen Kinentai was made. They released a commemorative Single called . Tsunku, the producer of Morning Musume, stated that the members chosen symbolize the grassroots beginning of the group; how they had five members ranging in age from 14-24. Additionally, each member was from an odd generation. On August 8, 2007 they released a second  single - which was also their last one - . The group was only active during 2007 for Morning Musume's 10th anniversary.

The group had a concert tour starting on August 11, 2007, ending September 1, 2007, located in six different stadiums. The tour was named , and was later released on DVD on November 14, 2007.

Discography

Singles

DVDs

References

Morning Musume
Japanese girl groups
Japanese pop music groups
Japanese idol groups
Musical groups established in 2007
Musical groups disestablished in 2007
Musical groups from Tokyo